Miss USA 1990 was the 39th Miss USA pageant, televised live from the Century II Convention Center in Wichita, Kansas on March 2, 1990. At the conclusion of the final competition, Carole Gist of Michigan was crowned by outgoing titleholder Gretchen Polhemus of Texas. Carole became the first African American winner ever and the first woman from Michigan to be crowned as Miss USA, ending the streak of "Texas Aces" from 1985.

For the first time, each judge's score was displayed to every audience, adding transparency to the process.

A major format change in 1990 transformed the Miss USA competition for the next decade: the delegates would face an extra round of elimination on finals night: the top six judges' questions.

Instead of reducing the top twelve to the usual final five, the judges would pick an intermediate top six. Those six finalists would answer questions from the judges and the field was reduced to a final three, who would face the traditional final question, adding unpredictability to the competition after five Texan Miss USA winners from GuyRex Associates, which would lose its Miss Texas USA franchise the next year.

The pageant was hosted by Dick Clark for the second of five times, with color commentary by Leeza Gibbons and Laura Harring, Miss USA 1985. 

This was the first time the pageant was held in Wichita, where it would be staged for the next three years.

Results

Placements

Final Competition

Special awards

Historical significance 
 Michigan wins competition for the first time and surpasses its previous highest placement in 1976. Also becoming in the 23rd state who does it for the first time.
 South Carolina earns the 1st runner-up position for the fourth time. The last time it placed this was in 1970.
 New Jersey earns the 2nd runner-up position for the second time and repeats the same position as the past year 1989.
 Alaska finishes as Top 6 for the first time and reaches its highest placement since 1964.
 Georgia finishes as Top 6 for the first time.
 Kentucky finishes as Top 6 for the first time and reaches its highest placement since 1982.
 States that placed in semifinals the previous year were Georgia, Illinois, New Jersey and Texas.
 Texas placed for the sixteenth consecutive year.
 Illinois placed for the seventh consecutive year. 
 Georgia placed for the fifth consecutive year. 
 New Jersey made its second consecutive placement.
 Mississippi, South Carolina and Tennessee last placed in 1988.
 Ohio last placed in 1986.
 District of Columbia last placed in 1984.
 Michigan last placed in 1983.
 Kentucky last placed in 1982.
 Alaska last placed in 1978.
 California and Oklahoma break an ongoing streak of placements since 1988.
 Gina Tolleson would represent the USA at Miss World, where she took the title. Carole Gist represented USA at Miss Universe 1990 where she finished runner-up to Norway's Mona Grudt. Had Gist won Miss Universe, Tolleson would have become Miss USA and Miss New Jersey, Karin Hartz, would have represented the USA at the 1990 Miss World Pageant. This was the closest the USA had come to winning both major Big 4 pageants.

Scores

Preliminary competition
The following are the contestants' scores in the preliminary competition.

 Winner
 First runner-up
 Second runner-up 
 Top 6 Finalist 
 Top 12 Semifinalist

Final competition

 Winner 
 First runner-up
 Second runner-up 
 Top 6 Finalist

Delegates
The Miss USA 1990 delegates were:

 Alabama - Natalie Moore
 Alaska - Karin Meyer   
 Arizona - Lezlie Leonard
 Arkansas - Kathryn Harris
 California - Cynthia Nelson
 Colorado - Michelle Harrison
 Connecticut - Allison Barbeau-Diorio
 Delaware - Nicci Dent
 District of Columbia - Catherine Staples  
 Florida - Tricia Hahn
 Georgia - Brenda Leithleiter
 Hawaii - Leimomi Bacalso
 Idaho - Cindy Estey
 Illinois - Karla Myers   
 Indiana - Meri Lyn Buker
 Iowa - Elizabeth Muelhaupt
 Kansas - Rebecca Porter
 Kentucky - Tiffany Tenfelde   
 Louisiana - Jeanne Burns
 Maine - Leigh Bubar
 Maryland - Julie Stanford
 Massachusetts - Laureen Murphy
 Michigan - Carole Gist
 Minnesota - Janet Tveita
 Mississippi - Stephanie Teneyck
 Missouri - Lori Suschnick
 Montana - Kimberlee Burger
 Nebraska - Angela Humphrey
 Nevada - Michelle Yegee
 New Hampshire - Lisa Parnpichate
 New Jersey - Karin Hartz
 New Mexico - Larissa Canaday
 New York - Patricia Murphy
 North Carolina - Altman Allen
 North Dakota - Kari Larson
 Ohio - Melissa Proctor
 Oklahoma - Lauralynn Norton
 Oregon - Elizabeth Michaud
 Pennsylvania - Elizabeth Cebak
 Rhode Island - Susan Lima
 South Carolina - Gina Tolleson
 South Dakota - Valerie Sejnoha
 Tennessee - Charita Moses   
 Texas - Stephanie Kuehne
 Utah - Debra Linn 
 Vermont - Stephanie Bessey
 Virginia - Evelyn Green
 Washington - Melissa Dickson
 West Virginia - Sabrina Anderson
 Wisconsin -  Lynn Mulcahy
 Wyoming - Cheryl James

Crossovers
1990 was the year with the smallest number of crossover contestants since 1986.
Only three delegates had previously competed in the Miss Teen USA pageant: 
Julie Stanford (Maryland) - Miss Maryland Teen USA 1986
Kari Larson (North Dakota) - Miss North Dakota Teen USA 1984 (Semi-finalist at Miss Teen USA 1984)
Allison Barbeau-Diorio (Connecticut) - Miss Connecticut Teen USA 1987
No former Miss America delegates competed for the second year in a row.
Gina Tolleson was later appointed as Miss World America 1990 by the Miss USA pageant and won Miss World 1990.

Judges
Eileen Fulton
Kerry Gordy
Rebecca Brandewyne
Robin Cousins
Barbara Peterson
Dan Isaacson
Dr. Irene Kassorla
Jackie Joyner Kersee
Randy Stone
Judi Sheppard Missett
Gordon Cooper

References

External links
Official website

1990
March 1990 events in the United States
1990 beauty pageants
1990 in Kansas
1990